is an upper secondary school in Kagoshima City, Kagoshima Prefecture, Japan. It is a co-educational public school.

Overview
The two schools became Kagoshima Prefectural Konan High School in 1949. The official founding year is 1906 when Daini-Kagoshima Middle School was founded.

The school's main building with the dome was built in 1930 (early Showa era) as the Daini-Kagoshima Middle School's building. In addition, there are birthplaces of Ōkubo Toshimichi, also called , and Saigō Takamori, also called , near the school. The school was named  for these reasons.

The ivy and the camphor tree in the schoolyard are the school symbols. The school emblem features deer antlers and a flower of dianthus.  Kagoshima Prefectural Tsurumaru High School is the rival school.

As of 2022, this school has  which is three-year course.

Notable alumni
Politics
 Chieko Nōno - member of the National Diet, Minister of Justice, Minister of State for Youth Affairs and Measures for Declining Birthrate
 Osanori Koyama - member of the National Diet, Minister of Construction, Minister of State for Director General of Environment Agency
 Moichi Miyazaki - member of the National Diet, Minister of State for Director General of the Science and Technology Agency
 Tadahiko Shimadzu - member of the National Diet
 Toshifumi Kosehira - member of the National Diet

Academic
 Akira Arimura - neuroscientist, biochemist, Professor Emeritus at Tulane University in America
 Isamu Akasaki - engineer and physicist, inventor of the bright gallium nitride (GaN) p-n junction blue LED, Nobel prize in Physics, Charles Stark Draper Prize, Queen Elizabeth Prize for Engineering, IEEE Edison Medal, Kyoto Prize, Japan Academy Prize & Imperial Prize of the Japan Academy, Person of Cultural Merit, Order of Culture, Professor Emeritus at Nagoya University, Distinguished Professor at Meijo University
 Kikuo Arakawa - medical scientist, cardiovascular scientist, internist, World Hypertension League Award, International Society of Hypertension Distinguished Fellow Award, Professor Emeritus at Fukuoka University, the 12th President of the International Society of Hypertension
 Kimito Funatsu - chemist of chemoinformatics, Herman Skolnik Award, Professor Emeritus at University of Tokyo
 Kunio Shiota - life scientist, biochemist, Professor Emeritus at University of Tokyo
 Hideki Sakurai - organic chemist, Japan Academy Prize & Imperial Prize of the Japan Academy, Professor Emeritus at Tohoku University, The President of the Chemical Society of Japan
 Akitsune Imamura - seismologist

Culture
 Katsusuke Miyauchi - author of fiction and essays, Yomiuri Prize for Literature
 Taro Yashima - artist and author of picture books in America, the Caldecott Honor
 Shinobu Kaitani - manga artist
 Iemasa Kayumi - voice actor, actor
 Toshiaki Megumi - comedian, actor, television presenter
 Seishirō Nishida - actor
 Takeji Fujishima - yōga painter, Order of Culture
 Goyō Hashiguchi - print artist, book designer

Sports
 Jun'ichi Miyashita - swimmer, Olympics bronze medalist
 Sanpō Toku - judo player

Surrounding area
Southern
 Kagoshima University
 Kagoshima City Transportation Bureau
 
Northern
 Museum of the Meiji Restoration
 
 Kagoshima Women's College
Eastern
 
 (a shinto shrine)
Western
 Kagoshima-Chūō Station
 Amu Plaza Kagoshima and Amuran Ferris wheel

Notes

References

External links

Kagoshima Prefectural Konan Senior High School official website (in Japanese)
Kagoshima Prefectural Konan Senior High School blog HP (in Japanese)

High schools in Kagoshima Prefecture
Educational institutions established in 1906
Education in Kagoshima Prefecture
Registered Tangible Cultural Properties
1906 establishments in Japan
Buildings and structures in Kagoshima